Saint Henry or St Henry may refer to:

Henry II, Holy Roman Emperor
Henry, Bishop of Uppsala, Catholic saint and martyr 
 St. Henry of Cocket, hermit and miracle-worker of Coquet Island in north England, a Dane of birth (d. 1127)
Saint Henry, Indiana, an unincorporated town
St. Henry, Ohio, a village

See also
San Enrique (disambiguation)